Girum Ermias (Amharic: ግሩም ኤርሚያስ; born 16 March 1978) is an Ethiopian actor, director and scriptwriter who dominated the Ethiopian film industry by starring more than fifteen films. 

He was best known in notable films such as Hermela (2005), Siryet (2007), Moriam Meder (2008), and Lamba (2015).

Life and career
Girum Ermias was born on 16 March 1978 in Addis Ababa, Ethiopia. At an early age, Girum developed his acting interests. He attended Alem Maya Primary School for his primary education and Addis Ketema High School and Ayer Tena High School for his secondary education. He then began scriptwriting, directing as well as advanced to diploma from Ethiopia's Hollyland Art Academy. 

He starred in more than fifteen films that are almost considered notable: Hermela (2005), Siryet (2007), Moriam Meder (2008), and Lamba (2015). Girum acknowledges film contents which have high social effect and "enlightening". 

Girum is a father of two children.

Filmography

References

External links
 Girum Ermias on Yageru

1978 births
21st-century Ethiopian male actors
21st-century Ethiopian actors
Ethiopian actors
Ethiopian male actors
People from Addis Ababa
Living people